The N85 road is a national secondary road in Ireland connecting Ennis and Ennistymon. The route connects to the M18 Ennis bypass and forms part of the Ennis outer ring road as the "N85 Western Relief Road". From Ennis the route continues in a north - west direction and terminates at the junction with the N67 at Ennistymon. It is located entirely in County Clare.

See also
Roads in Ireland 
Motorways in Ireland
National primary road
Regional road

References
Roads Act 1993 (Classification of National Roads) Order 2012 – Department of Transport

National secondary roads in the Republic of Ireland
Roads in County Clare